David Walker Lyon (born 2 September 1943) is a former English cricketer.  Lyon was a right-handed batsman who bowled right-arm fast-medium.  He was born at Douglas, Isle of Man.

Lyon made his debut for Cambridgeshire in the 1965 Minor Counties Championship against Bedfordshire.  From 1965 to 1972, he represented the county in 15 Minor Counties matches, with his final appearance coming against Bedfordshire.

Lyon also represented Cambridgeshire in a single List A cricket match against Buckinghamshire in the 1972 Gillette Cup.  In his only List-A match, he took a single wicket at with figures of 1/44.

His brother, Andrew, played List A cricket for Buckinghamshire and Middlesex.

References

External links
David Lyon at Cricinfo
David Lyon at CricketArchive

1943 births
Cambridgeshire cricketers
English cricketers
Living people
Manx cricketers
People from Douglas, Isle of Man